Sottevast is a commune in Normandy in north-western France.

Sottevast in World War II

During World War II, there was a German storage and servicing bunker for V-weapons near Sottevast. The site was captured by the 504th Parachute Infantry Regiment of the 82nd Airborne Division during the Normandy campaign.

References

Communes of Manche
Ruins in Normandy
V-weapon subterranea
World War II strategic bombing